Kutuzovskaya is a station on the Moscow Central Circle of the Moscow Metro that opened in September 2016.

Name
Originally planned to be named Kutuzovo, the city altered the name slightly to Kutuzovskaya in concert with the connecting station  on Filyovskaya Line.

Transfer
Passengers may make free out-of-station transfers to Kutuzovskaya station on the Filyovskaya Line. It is also possible to make a free transfer to the Arbatsko-Pokrovskaya Line and Kalininsko-Solntsevskaya Line at Park Pobedy; however the distance of more than one kilometer makes this impractical.

Gallery

References

External links 
 
 (untitled)mkzd.ru

Moscow Metro stations
Railway stations in Russia opened in 2016
Moscow Central Circle stations